Frizell is an unincorporated community in Pawnee County, Kansas, United States.

History
A post office was opened in Frizell in 1904, and remained in operation until it was discontinued in 1933.

References

Further reading

External links
 Pawnee County maps: Current, Historic, KDOT

Unincorporated communities in Pawnee County, Kansas
Unincorporated communities in Kansas